Richard Archibald Zoll (December 10, 1913 – September 6, 1985) was an American professional football player in the National Football League for the Cleveland Rams and Green Bay Packers from 1937 to 1939 as a guard and tackle. He played at the collegiate level at Indiana University-Bloomington. He was also the brother of original Packers Martin and Carl Zoll.

See also
Green Bay Packers players

References

External links

1913 births
Sportspeople from Green Bay, Wisconsin
Players of American football from Wisconsin
American football offensive guards
American football offensive tackles
Indiana Hoosiers football players
Cleveland Rams players
Green Bay Packers players
1985 deaths